George William Whitehead, Jr. (August 2, 1918 – April 12, 2004) was an American professor of mathematics at the Massachusetts Institute of Technology, a member of the United States National Academy of Sciences, and a Fellow of the American Academy of Arts and Sciences. He is known for his work on algebraic topology. He invented the J-homomorphism, and was among the first to systematically calculate the homotopy groups of spheres. He is also central to the study of Stable homotopy theory, in particular making concrete the connections between Spectra and Generalized homology/cohomology theories.

Whitehead was born in Bloomington, Illinois, and received his Ph.D. in mathematics from the University of Chicago in 1941, under the supervision of Norman Steenrod. After teaching at Purdue University, Princeton University, and Brown University, he took a position at MIT in 1949, where he remained until his retirement in 1985. He advised 13 Ph.D. students, including Robert Aumann and John Coleman Moore, and has over 1,320 academic descendants.

Selected publications

References

 George Whitehead dies at 85, MIT News Office

External links

 Haynes R. Miller, "George W. Whitehead Jr.", Biographical Memoirs of the National Academy of Sciences (2015)

20th-century American mathematicians
21st-century American mathematicians
Topologists
Members of the United States National Academy of Sciences
Massachusetts Institute of Technology School of Science faculty
Purdue University faculty
Princeton University faculty
Brown University faculty
University of Chicago alumni
People from Bloomington, Illinois
1918 births
2004 deaths
Mathematicians from Illinois